Ignace  is a township in the Kenora District of Northwestern Ontario, Canada, located at Highway 17 (Trans Canada Highway) and Secondary Highway 599, and on the Canadian Pacific Railway between Thunder Bay and Kenora. It is on the shore of Agimak Lake, and as of 2016, the population of Ignace was 1,202.

The town was named after Ignace Mentour by Sir Sandford Fleming in 1879. Ignace Mentour was the key Indigenous guide through this region during Fleming's 1872 railway survey, recorded in George Monro Grant's journal of the survey, Ocean to Ocean. Mentour had also served with Sir George Simpson in Simpson's final years as governor of Rupert's Land.

During Ignace's early days, there was a settlement of railway boxcars used by the English residents there called "Little England".

Although Ignace was incorporated in 1908, it was something of a latecomer to some modern conveniences, such as rotary dial telephone, which did not arrive in the town until 1956.

Forestry and tourism support Ignace's economy, today, and one attraction is the three-storey log White Otter Castle, located on White Otter Lake at Turtle River, and built by James Alexander McOuat between 1903 and 1914.

Ignace is one of two Ontario communities being considered as a potential deep geological repository site for Canada's used nuclear fuel. Initial borehole drilling and core sample testing are taking place in a rock formation known as the Revell Batholith, located south of Highway 17, about 35 kilometres west of Ignace (between Ignace and Wabigoon Lake Ojibway Nation).

In the 1950s, Ignace's first newspaper, the Village Tattler, started there to serve the town. It was published by the local YMCA. In 1971, Dennis Smyk started the Ignace Driftwood, which was suspended two years later, but was revived in 1979 and ran until 2018. During Driftwoods suspension, the Ignace Courier was published for the town's local news.

 Demographics 
 Population in 2016: 1,202 (unchanged from 2011)
 Population in 2011: 1,202 (-16.0% from 2006)
 Population in 2006: 1,431 (-16.3% from 2001)
 Population in 2001: 1,709 (-4.1% from 1996)
 Population in 1996: 1,782 (-7.9% from 1991)
 Population in 1991: 1,935

Local media
Newspapers
 Ignace Driftwood – In 1971, Dennis Smyk started the Ignace Driftwood, which was suspended two years later, but was revived in 1979 and ceased operations in 2018. During Driftwood's suspension, the Mattabi Memo and the Ignace Courier'' were published for the town's local news.

Radio
 CBES AM 690 (CBC Radio One) – rebroadcast transmitter of station based in Thunder Bay
 CKDR AM 1340 – rebroadcast transmitter of station based in Dryden

See also

List of townships in Ontario
List of francophone communities in Ontario

References

External links

Municipalities in Kenora District
Single-tier municipalities in Ontario
Township municipalities in Ontario
1879 establishments in Ontario
Populated places established in 1879